Doug Henderson is an American musician, producer and mastering engineer based in New York City. He has been composing and performing since 1985 and has collaborated with a variety of artists and musicians, including John Zorn, Zeena Parkins and Ikue Mori. He has also had a prolific career as a recording and mastering engineer, working with bands such as Firewater, Angels of Light, Swans and System of a Down. Henderson was the leader of two bands, Krackhouse and Spongehead, during the 1980s and 1990s. He received a Foundation for Contemporary Arts Grants to Artist award (2007).

Biography
Douglas Henderson was born in 1960. He received his B.A. in music from Bard College in 1982, during which time he played in a band called Samoans with future Krackhouse member Chris Cochrane. He received his M.A. from Princeton in 1985 and his Ph.D. in Music Composition from Princeton University in 1991.

Discography

References

External links

Living people
1960 births
American post-punk musicians
American audio engineers
Mastering engineers
Guitarists from New York City
American male bass guitarists
20th-century American bass guitarists
Engineers from New York City
20th-century American male musicians